Robert Chester may refer to:
Robert Chester (lawyer), colonel in the US Marines and lawyer
Robert of Chester, English Arabist of the 12th century
Robert Chester (poet) (fl. 1601), English poet
Robert I. Chester (1793–1892), Tennessee politician
Bob Chester (1908–1977), American bandleader and tenor saxophonist

See also